Mesosa pictipes is a species of beetle in the family Cerambycidae. It was described by Gressitt in 1937. It is known from Japan.

Subspecies
 Mesosa pictipes miyamotoi Hayashi, 1956
 Mesosa pictipes pictipes Gressitt, 1937

References

pictipes
Beetles described in 1937